Kung Fu is an American martial arts action-adventure television series that premiered on The CW on April 7, 2021. Set in the present, it is an adaptation of the 1970s series of the same title. It is produced by Warner Bros. Television, as was the original series and Kung Fu: The Legend Continues. Executive producers include Christina M. Kim (developer of The CW series), Ed Spielman (creator of the original series), Greg Berlanti, Martin Gero, Robert Berens, and Sarah Schechter. It is one of a few American network dramas to feature a predominantly Asian American cast, including veteran actor Tzi Ma. In May 2021, the series was renewed for a second season which premiered on March 9, 2022. In March 2022, the series was renewed for a third season which premiered on October 5, 2022.

Premise
Set in the present day, the series follows a young Chinese American woman whose personal issues force her to leave college and make a life-changing journey to an isolated monastery in China. On her return to America three years later, she starts using her martial arts skills and Shaolin values to protect her community when her hometown of San Francisco is plagued by ongoing crime and corruption, especially those being threatened by the Triad, all while dealing with her estranged family and searching for the assassin who killed her Shaolin mentor and is now targeting her.

This version is a re-imagining, rather than a reboot, of the 1972 television series starring David Carradine as Kwai Chang Caine, the fugitive monk traveling the American Old West.

Cast

Main

 Olivia Liang as Nicky Shen, a Harvard dropout and an outsider to her family who is an expert in martial arts, which she uses to stop a growing criminal problem that has overtaken her community. She acts as a vigilante for those who need help while discovering her potential and unlocking her destiny, as well as trying to reconnect with everyone around her. It was later revealed that she is a descendant of Liang Daiyu.
 Kheng Hua Tan as Mei-Li Shen, Nicky's strict mother, who helped her husband in the restaurant business and is not happy with Nicky for abandoning the family and was the reason for Nicky and Evan's breakup. She is keeping secrets that could threaten the family and was unaware of Nicky's mission to help others until she told Nicky the truth about being a descendant of Liang Daiyu.
 Eddie Liu as Henry Yan, a martial arts practitioner, expert on traditional Chinese art and mythology, and Nicky's love interest. He has a criminal past that he has regretted but has vowed to go straight while helping Nicky.
 Shannon Dang as Althea Shen-Soong (née Shen), Nicky's larger-than-life older tech-savvy sister who is newly engaged with plans of having the perfect life, despite dealing with a painful past involving sexual abuse by her former employer. An expert in cyber-hacking, she assists Nicky in her mission to stop the criminal elements.
 Jon Prasida as Ryan Shen, Nicky's estranged younger brother who is a quick-witted medical student, runs a free community clinic, and is openly gay, as they try to repair their relationship while assisting her
 Gavin Stenhouse as Evan Hartley, a highly successful assistant district attorney who still has feelings for Nicky, despite having a new girlfriend and Mei-Li's disapproval of him dating Nicky in the past. He acts as a go-to for Nicky while watching out for her, especially with knowing about Henry's criminal past.
 Vanessa Kai as Pei-Ling Zhang, Nicky's shifu (mentor) at the Shaolin Monastery in Yunnan Province, China. She was killed by her sister Zhilan while trying to defend the monastery from her gang of raiders and appears as a ghost to help guide Nicky. It was later revealed that she accidentally killed her own father and Zhilan blamed her.
 Kai also portrays Xiao / The Alchemist, the creator of the warrior and guardian bloodlines who aimed to create a more powerful human. Jennifer Khoe portrays Xiao's true form in the third season.
 Tony Chung as Dennis Soong, Althea's husband and a wealthy investor from a rich family
 Tzi Ma as Jin Shen, Nicky's father, a restaurant owner who is upset over his daughter's choices despite his love for her, while at the same time keeping secrets that could destroy their family due to the Triad's grip on the local community, as well as concerns over his health problems. He was initially unaware of Nicky's actions and her family lineage to Liang Daiyu, finding out shortly after Nicky.
 Yvonne Chapman as Zhilan Zhang (season 2–present; recurring season 1), Pei-Ling's sister with deep criminal ties and a mysterious connection to the Shaolin monastery where Nicky trained. She seeks to collect 8 sacred weapons (which includes The Sword of Liang Daiyu, a pair of Shuang Gou, a dagger, an axe, a pair of crescent moon knives, another sword, a crossbow, and a Meteor Hammer) and unlock their powers, unaware that Nicky came into contact with the Sword of Liang Daiyu that revealed her untapped destiny (she is unaware of Nicky being a direct descendant of Liang Daiyu). After killing Pei-Ling, Nicky's mentor, she becomes her archenemy.
 JB Tadena as Sebastian Cailao (season 3; recurring season 2), Harmony Dumplings' new chef and Ryan's love interest

Recurring

 Bradley Gibson as Joe Harper (season 1), a Bay Area LGBTQ/social activist and Ryan's former romantic interest
 Ludi Lin as Kerwin Tan (season 1-2), a vengeful playboy and heir to a family fortune who has personal history and aids Zhilan in gathering the eight weapons
Lin also plays the part of Russell Tan after he has his soul transferred into Kerwin's body.
 Janet Kidder as District Attorney Hughes, Evan's boss
 Kee Chan as Russell Tan, Kerwin and Juliette's father
 Marissa Cuevas as Nadia, Evan's secretary who helps him assist Nicky
 Vanessa Yao as Mia Yang (season 2-3), the Shen siblings' cousin and their Aunt Mei-Xue's daughter
 Annie Q. as Juliette Tan (season 2), Russell Tan's ruthless daughter
 Andrew Tinpo Lee as Frank (season 2), Jin's friend who helps in the community
 Terry Chen as Daniel Yan (season 2), Henry's estranged father
 Ben Levin as Bo (season 3)
 Kim Rhodes as Carrie (season 3)
 Donald Heng as Anthony Chan (season 3)

Episodes

Series overview

Season 1 (2021)

Season 2 (2022)

Season 3 (2022–23)

Production

Development

In September 2017, it was reported that Greg Berlanti and Wendy Mericle were developing a female-led reboot of the series for Fox. In October 2018, it was announced that Sleepy Hollow executive producer Albert Kim was redeveloping the series and that Fox had given the project a put pilot commitment. In November 2019, it was announced that the reboot had moved to The CWwhich is home to the majority of the Arrowverse shows, all of which are produced by Berlantiand would be written by Christina M. Kim and Martin Gero. The series received a pilot order by the network. It was announced on May 12, 2020, that The CW had given Kung Fu a series order; a poster featuring Liang and social media accounts was set up the same day.

This is the third attempt of a Kung Fu reboot. According to PrimeTimer, "two different incarnations of this project have been set up in recent years at Fox, both featuring a female protagonist. Mega producers Berlanti Productions and Warner Bros. Television were behind both projects, but neither went to pilot."

The first reboot attempt had a main character named Lucy Chang, a Buddhist monk and kung fu master who traveled through America in the 1950s in search of the man who stole her child years before. The second reboot attempt was about a young Chinese-American woman who inherits her father's kung fu studio, only to find out it's a secret center dedicated to helping members of the Chinatown community who have nowhere else to turn. On May 3, 2021, The CW renewed the series for a second season. On March 22, 2022, The CW renewed the series for a third season.

Casting
In January and February 2020, Deadline reported the casting of the reboot with Tzi Ma and Kheng Hua Tan as Jin Shen and Mei-Li, Jon Prasida as Ryan Shen, Shannon Dang as Althea Shen, Eddie Liu as Henry Yan, and Olivia Liang as the character Nicky. In March 2020, Gavin Stenhouse and Gwendoline Yeo were cast as Evan Hartley and Zhilan. Tony Chung was cast as Dennis Soong on October 6, 2020. On November 18, 2020, Yvonne Chapman was cast as Zhilan in a recurring capacity. In February 2021, Ludi Lin and Bradley Gibson were cast as Kerwin and Joe Harper in recurring roles. On August 26, 2021, Chapman was promoted to series regular for the second season. On January 6, 2022, Vanessa Yao, Annie Q. and JB Tadena joined the cast in recurring roles for the second season. On July 7, 2022, it was announced that Chapman is set to return as series regular while Tadena was promoted to a series regular for the third season. On July 27, 2022, Ben Levin and Kim Rhodes were cast in recurring capacities for the third season.

Pre-production 
The main actress Olivia Liang mentioned she avoided martial arts prior to this role due to stereotypes and would only learn when she got paid. She later embraced the sport after being cast and supported bringing depth to Asian characters with a martial arts background.

Filming
Principal photography for the first season began on October 16, 2020 and concluded on April 27, 2021, in Langley, British Columbia. Filming for the second season began on September 20, 2021 and concluded on March 15, 2022. Filming for the third season began on July 18, 2022 and concluded on December 20.

Broadcast
Kung Fu premiered on April 7, 2021, on The CW. In Canada, the series airs on CTV 2, simulcast with The CW. The second season premiered on March 9, 2022. The third season premiered on October 5, 2022.

Reception

Critical response
On the review aggregator website Rotten Tomatoes, the series has an approval rating of 86% based on 21 critic reviews, with an average rating of 6.9/10. The website's critic consensus states, "Kung Fu early episodes could use a little more focus, but beautifully choreographed fight scenes and a likable cast—led by Olivia Liang's star-making performance—inspire hope for a bright future." On Metacritic, it has a weighted average score of 65 out of 100 based on 10 critic reviews, indicating "generally favorable reviews".

Sam Stone of Comic Book Resources reviewed the series and stated that "nuances of each character relationship are explicitly laid out in conversation rather than hinted at or more organically woven into the show as if the characters aren't aware of their own backstories." While the fight choreography was well received, it relied on too much slow motion. CBR saw potential in the show with the cast as long it could overcome "bad habits" as the show progresses. Jennifer Griffin of TV Pulse Magazine was more critical and also agreed that there was too much exposition in the first episode. It relied on the predictable formulaic superhero format that Greg Berlanti has incorporated in previous CW shows. While having a mainly Asian-American cast was praised, the review goes on to say "Like America herself, the series needs to show its characters a little more love, and demonstrate a determination to look beyond formula, cliches, and stereotypes for that which truly connects us, as TV viewers, as superhero fans, but mostly as human beings." Robert Lloyd of LA Times wrote that the pilot was very busy with a messy exposition, which also reinforced Asian stereotypes. Max Gao of Vulture rated the first episode 4 out of 5 and said, "It wouldn't be a CW show without a classic love triangle—and Kung Fu has set up a brilliant one."

Ratings

Season 1

Season 2

Season 3

Home media

See also
Warrior (TV series)

References

External links
 

2021 American television series debuts
2020s American crime drama television series
2020s American LGBT-related drama television series
2020s American mystery television series
American action adventure television series
Chinese American television
Cultural depictions of businesspeople
The CW original programming
English-language television shows
Filicide in fiction
Kung Fu (1972 TV series)
Martial arts television series
Mass media portrayals of the working class
Nonlinear narrative television series
Television series about families
Television series by Warner Bros. Television Studios
Television series reboots
Television series set in the 2020s
Television shows filmed in British Columbia
Television shows set in San Francisco
Television shows set in California
Television productions postponed due to the COVID-19 pandemic
Vigilante television series
Works about sexual abuse